The FIS Ski Flying World Ski Championships 2004 took place on 19–22 February 2004 in Planica, Slovenia for the record fifth time. Planica hosted the championships previously in 1972, 1979, 1985, and 1994. The team event, consisting of two jumps, debuted at these championships.

Individual
20–21 February 2004.

Ahonen and Germany's Georg Späth had the longest jumps of the competition with their 225.0 m second round-jumps. Norway's Tommy Ingebrigtsen led after the first round, Späth after the second round, and Kiuru after the third round.

Team
22 February 2004.

Romøren had the longest jump of the event with his second round jump of 227.0 m.

Medal table

References

FIS Ski Flying World Championships
2004 in ski jumping
2004 in Slovenian sport
Ski jumping competitions in Slovenia
International sports competitions hosted by Slovenia
February 2004 sports events in Europe